The first season of the American television series The Mandalorian stars Pedro Pascal as the title character, a lone bounty hunter hired to retrieve "The Child". It is part of the Star Wars franchise, set five years after the events of Return of the Jedi (1983). The season was produced by Lucasfilm, Fairview Entertainment, and Golem Creations, with Jon Favreau serving as showrunner.

Work on a new live-action Star Wars television series was announced in November 2017. Favreau signed on in March 2018, with Pascal cast a month after filming began in October 2018 at Manhattan Beach Studios in California. Visual effects company Industrial Light & Magic developed the StageCraft technology for the series, using virtual sets and a 360-degree video wall to create the series' environments. In addition to this new technology, practical effects were emphasized for the series.

The eight-episode season premiered on the streaming service Disney+ on November 12, 2019, and ran until December 27. It was met with positive reviews, was nominated for Outstanding Drama Series at the 72nd Primetime Emmy Awards, and won seven Primetime Creative Arts Emmy Awards. A second season was confirmed in July 2019.

Episodes

Cast and characters

Starring
 Pedro Pascal as Din Djarin / The Mandalorian
 "The Child"

Recurring co-stars

 Carl Weathers as Greef Karga
 Werner Herzog as "The Client"
 Omid Abtahi as Dr. Pershing
 Nick Nolte as the voice of Kuiil
 Taika Waititi as the voice of IG-11
 Gina Carano as Cara Dune
 Giancarlo Esposito as Moff Gideon
 Emily Swallow as "The Armorer"

Other co-stars
 Amy Sedaris as Peli Motto
 Jake Cannavale as Toro Calican
 Ming-Na Wen as Fennec Shand
 Mark Boone Junior as Ran Malk
 Bill Burr as Migs Mayfeld
 Natalia Tena as Xi'an
 Clancy Brown as Burg
 Richard Ayoade as the voice of Q9-0
 Ismael Cruz Córdova as Qin

Production

Development
In November 2017, Disney CEO Bob Iger announced that Disney and Lucasfilm were developing a live-action Star Wars television series for the new streaming service Disney+. Jon Favreau pitched an idea for the series to Lucasfilm president Kathleen Kennedy, who suggested he discuss the idea with Dave Filoni, executive producer on the animated series Star Wars: The Clone Wars and Star Wars Rebels. In March 2018, Lucasfilm announced that Favreau would write and executive produce the series, with Filoni, Kennedy, and Colin Wilson also executive producing. In May, Favreau said he had written four of the series' eight episodes before being officially hired for the project.

Favreau announced that the series was titled The Mandalorian on October 3, and revealed the premise of the show. Directors for the season were revealed the next day, including Filoni, Taika Waititi, Bryce Dallas Howard, Rick Famuyiwa, and Deborah Chow. Favreau was unable to direct any of the first season due to his commitments to The Lion King (2019), and wanted the series' directors to be a diverse group of filmmakers who could bring different perspectives to the series. The only prerequisite he had for the directors was that they love Star Wars. According to Famuyiwa, Favreau described the group as a "Dirty Dozen, Magnificent Seven type of crew". The season had a budget of $100 million.

Casting
After being rumored to be cast in the title role, Pedro Pascal was confirmed to be portraying the Mandalorian in November 2018. Pascal initially thought he was being cast as the Star Wars character Boba Fett due to the visual similarities between that character and the Mandalorian, but the latter is actually a separate character named Din Djarin. Gina Carano and Nick Nolte joined the series' cast later in November. Lucasfilm announced the next month that Pascal would star alongside Carano, Nolte, Giancarlo Esposito, Emily Swallow, Carl Weathers, Omid Abtahi, and Werner Herzog. Favreau revealed in March 2019 that Taika Waititi would provide the voice for a bounty hunter droid in the series, believed to be the character IG-88. This was revealed a month later to be a new character, IG-11, when character details for other cast members were announced. Weathers' character, Greef Karga, was originally an alien that was killed off in the third episode; the prosthetic make-up was removed and the role extended during production.

The footage shown at Star Wars Celebration in April 2019 revealed that Bill Burr and Mark Boone Junior had been cast in the season, with Burr portraying an outlaw. At the D23 Expo in August, it was revealed Ming-Na Wen would appear, and the next month, Julia Jones's casting was announced.

Filming and effects

New technology 

Visual effects studio Industrial Light & Magic, a subsidiary of Lucasfilm, partnered with video game developer Epic Games to create a new system for the series named StageCraft, based on Epic's game engine Unreal Engine. StageCraft consists of large LED video screens on which digital environments can be rendered in real time for actors to perform in front of. During pre-production on the series, virtual photography was used to plan the series' filming and determine what environments would be needed on set. The digital environments were then created by ILM and added to StageCraft ready for live action photography with the actors. Some of these environments were based on location photography in countries such as Iceland and Chile. During filming, the digital environments were rendered on a video wall in real time, allowing the filmmakers and actors to see the environments. The images rendered on the video wall were often of a high enough quality to be used as final effects.

Principal photography 
Filming began during the first week of October 2018, with Filoni directing the first episode. The season was filmed at Manhattan Beach Studios in California under the working title Project Huckleberry, with limited location filming in the Los Angeles area. This first and third episodes were filmed together as one block, with Filoni and Chow working on their episodes at the same time. George Lucas visited the series' set as a birthday surprise for Favreau on October 19. Several items described as "nothing of substance" were stolen from the series' set on October 25.

Filoni made his live-action directorial debut with the series. He saw The Mandalorian as a chance to apply lessons he had learned from Lucas about live-action filmmaking during the making of the Star Wars animated series, and also described Favreau as a mentor who was furthering Filoni's education and could help him overcome challenges specific to live-action. Filoni also served as a second unit director for the other filmmakers, filming quick pick-up shots for them as needed while they were busy on other scenes. Favreau noted that the fourth episode of the series, "Sanctuary", was the most difficult to make due to its forest setting and action requirements, and joked that this was the reason that Howard, the most inexperienced of the first season's directors, was given that episode to direct. Howard felt protected by the experience of Favreau and Filoni, feeling comfortable to go to them with any questions about filmmaking and Star Wars, respectively. Howard also felt she had creative freedom when directing the episode, something that surprised her father Ron Howard who directed the film Solo: A Star Wars Story (2018).

Pascal's commitments to filming Wonder Woman 1984 (2020) and performing in a Broadway production of King Lear resulted in stunt doubles Brendan Wayne and Lateef Crowder portraying the Mandalorian on set in Pascal's absence, with Pascal later dubbing the lines. Pascal said he felt uneasy about this when there were "more than just a couple of pages of a one-on-one scene [and not] being able to totally author" the performance. But he said it was "so easy in such a sort of practical and unexciting way for it to be up to" Wayne and Crowder. Wayne worked with Pascal to develop the movements of the character. Filming for the first season wrapped on February 27, 2019.

Practical effects 
Favreau and the series' directors put emphasis on using practical effects where possible, with Famuyiwa explaining that it was the combination of groundbreaking effects and a grounded world and characters that first drew him to Star Wars as a child. Favreau noted that the StageCraft technology used during filming allowed the filmmakers to use more traditional production techniques since they were working within an environment that they could see on set. Legacy Effects created practical armor for the series, as well as the animatronics for the alien creatures. Visual effects were used to remove puppeteers and control rods from scenes that used puppets. One of the modelmakers creating models and puppets for the series was Tony McVey, who worked on the original Star Wars films. In order to recreate techniques used on the original Star Wars films, The Mandalorians prop master, Josh Roth, designed new weapons for the series based on real guns, as the original props had been modified versions of World War II gun props.

"The Child" was created primarily with an animatronic puppet, which was augmented with visual effects. The production had originally expected to mostly use CGI for the character. Different puppeteers controlled its body and head movements, its eyes, and its ears. Other puppeteers moved it for walking scenes. During filming on the third episode, Chow and the visual effects team removed the puppet so they could film a version of a scene without it. This was in case they decided that the puppet was not convincing enough and would need to be replaced with CGI. Herzog called them cowards for not trusting the puppet, and encouraged them not to avoid visual effects. He proved to be right, as the production discovered that the puppet worked better than expected and began retooling scenes to work around its limitations rather than resort to CGI.

Favreau wanted the series to feature "D-list" characters from the Star Wars films, which led to him creating the Ugnaught character Kuill. The species was first introduced in the background of The Empire Strikes Back (1980). Legacy's effects supervisor John Rosengrant explained that a performer could not emote through the heavy prosthetics required to portray an Ugnaught, so animatronics were added to the prosthetic head. Actress Misty Rosas wore the head and costume for the character while one puppeteer controlled the mouth movements and another controlled the eyebrows. The character's lines were recorded ahead of filming, with actor Nick Nolte providing two or three different readings for each line that could be played for the other actors. While performing, Rosas had to use physical signals to indicate to the puppeteers when she wanted the character speak.

The series includes Blurrgs, alien creatures that were first introduced in the non-canon film Ewoks: The Battle for Endor (1985). Filoni introduced them into canon with The Clone Wars and Rebels. They were primarily created with CGI, but the first time they are seen in the series, through the Mandalorian's binoculars, physical models were used. These were created by McVey and stop motion animated by Stoopid Buddy Stoodios. The stop motion movement informed the animation of the CGI Blurrgs. Legacy created a practical model of the droid assassin IG-11 as an on-set stand-in for lighting reference. It included the head, torso, and arms of the character, and basic puppeteering could be used to move the head. During filming, the awkward movement of the model was deemed to be a good fit for the character and it was used in more scenes than expected. The CGI version was moved in ways that would not be physically possible for a human performer, taking advantage of the character's inhuman appearance. This differed from K-2SO, a droid that animation director Hal Hickel had created for the film Rogue One: A Star Wars Story (2016), which was based on a motion capture performance.

For Rogue One, Hickel had collected various shots from the original Star Wars films of starships that had been created with physical models and motion control camera systems. He brought this collection to The Mandalorian as a style guide for how the Razor Crest should look and move. Favreau decided that he wanted a miniature model of the Razor Crest for lighting reference; the models for the series were created with a combination of 3D printing and hand sculpting. After seeing the model, Favreau suggested that a single shot be filmed using motion control techniques as further reference for the CGI. The series had not budgeted for this technique, which is more expensive than using CGI. ILM visual effects supervisor John Knoll built a new motion control rig for the series to use that he described as "garage operation style, quick and dirty". They went on to film 14 or 15 shots for the first season using the technique, and the remaining CGI shots of the Razor Crest in space were designed to emulate the model and motion control style.

Other visual effects 
Shots of the child where visual effects were used instead of the puppet include some scenes where the character is walking, and a scene where he eats a frog. For these, the visual effects team studied the inner workings of the puppet to ensure that their version matched its physical limitations.

Image Engine also created visual effects for the series, particularly in "Chapter 3: The Sin" and "Chapter 6: The Prisoner".

Music 
Composer Ludwig Göransson first met with Favreau in November 2018, when Favreau showed Göransson concept art for the series and discussed his inspirations for the story and tone, including Western and samurai films. After they began discussing the series, Favreau sent the all of the season's scripts to Göransson. The composer worked on his own for a month, spending 10 hours a day in his studio "going from instrument to instrument" and experimenting with different sounds. He wrote five or six different pieces of music during this time as potential themes for the series. One of the first instruments Göransson experimented with was the recorder. He found a bass recorder that he felt sounded unique, and digitally manipulated it to make it more "futuristic". That became the beginning of the series' main theme. Favreau and Filoni both approved of Göransson's initial concepts, especially his use of the recorder which Göransson described as "a very original, distinct, lonely sound that follows this gunslinger on his journey."

Favreau wanted the music to come from the perspective of the Mandalorian, serving as a replacement for the character's facial expressions since he is always wearing a helmet. The Mandalorian's theme that Göransson initially wrote for Favreau is used during the end credits, with Göransson writing different end credits cues for some of the episodes. The style of the series' end credits was designed around the score due to Favreau's love of Göransson's music. Göransson also wrote themes for supporting characters such as Greef Karga and Cara Dune, a theme for the Razor Crest, one for all the Mandalorians, and a travelling theme. When he first approached "The Child", Göransson wrote music closer to John Williams' work for the Star Wars films since he felt the character was the element of the series that was closest to the films. He also felt it was natural for the character's music to be "cute". However, Favreau did not want this to be the direction for the character since the Mandalorian does not consider the child to be cute. Elements of Göransson's original music for the child are introduced later on as the Mandalorian sees the child begin to use the Force. Göransson wanted to differentiate the sound of each episode, but also considered his score for the first season to be like a score for a single film with the main themes appearing in each episode and developing across the whole season.

When Göransson began composing the music for specific scenes, he recorded himself playing the main instruments and then augmented those recordings with synthesizers and other digital manipulation. This was then combined with recordings of a 70-piece orchestra. The orchestra was recorded in Los Angeles from April to September 2019, and featured many musicians who were recording Williams' score for Star Wars: The Rise of Skywalker (2019) at the same time. Göransson oversaw the recording of the score with his wife, musician Serena McKinney. He wrote four hours of music for the first season. This was the most music he had written for a single project at that time, and he worked on the season longer than any other project at that point. A soundtrack album was released digitally alongside the debut of each episode featuring music from that episode.

Marketing 
On October 4, 2018, the first promotional image from the series was released, featuring a Mandalorian with a rifle. About a week later, Favreau released a photo through his official Instagram account featuring a rifle with a two-pronged barrel, an apparent callback to Boba Fett's weapon in The Star Wars Holiday Special. Jon Favreau, Dave Filoni, and the main cast hosted a panel for The Mandalorian at Star Wars Celebration Chicago on April 14, 2019, where the first footage premiered to fans in attendance. The first official poster and trailer were released at the D23 Expo on August 23, 2019. A second and final trailer was released on October 28, 2019. On November 11, a sneak peek was released during Monday Night Football.

"The Child" merchandise
Favreau chose not to reveal "The Child" in any marketing for the series after a discussion with Donald Glover during the making of The Lion King in which Glover noted that audiences appreciate being surprised since it does not happen very much (Glover gave the surprise release of a Beyoncé album as an example). Favreau stated that Disney was on board with this decision, even though it meant they were unable to begin work on merchandise featuring the character before he was revealed in the series premiere in November 2019. This was due to the potential for those merchandise plans to leak and reveal the character early, and meant that merchandise of the character could not be ready for the Christmas and holiday season. After the series premiered, "The Child" became a breakout character with more attention on social media and in news stories about it (1,161) than any of the Democrats running for president at the time. By the end of November 2019 there was huge demand for merchandise featuring the character. Disney's merchandising unit had begun planning for the character, but had only released T-shirts featuring concept art so far. Companies such as Hasbro had begun work on "The Child" merchandise as well, but it would not be ready until 2020. A large amount of unofficial merchandise began to appear ahead of the holiday season.

Release 
The season premiered on Disney+ on the streaming service's United States launch day, November 12, 2019. The second episode was released on November 15, with weekly releases for subsequent episodes. The seventh episode was released early on December 18 so it could include a sneak preview of Star Wars: The Rise of Skywalker, which was released on December 20. When Disney+ became available in several European countries in late March 2020, episodes of the season were again made available weekly despite the full season having already been released in other territories, an approach that James Whitbrook of io9 described as "perplexing" and "dumb". The first two episodes were made available at launch in the countries on March 24, 2020, followed by the third on March 27, which each subsequent episode released weekly. "Chapter 1: The Mandalorian" will air on ABC, Freeform, and FX on February 24, 2023, in anticipation of the season three premiere on March 1, 2023.

Reception

Critical response

The review aggregator website Rotten Tomatoes reported a 93% approval rating with an average score of 7.95/10, based on 337 reviews. The site's critical consensus reads, "Action-packed and expertly-crafted—if at times a bit too withholding—The Mandalorian is a welcome addition to the Star Wars universe that benefits greatly from the cuteness of its cargo." Metacritic, which uses a weighted average, assigned a score of 70 out of 100 based on 29 critics, indicating "generally favorable reviews".

Zaki Hasan of the San Francisco Chronicle said the show "in essence allows the franchise to take a mulligan with Boba Fett. Take the look, take that ineffable 'cool,' and transfer it over to an entirely new character who offers an untouched canvas, while giving the audience something that feels familiar." He added, "Three episodes in, that's really all The Mandalorian is: a feeling. A good feeling, mind you, but rather than any specific storytelling quality, it's that feeling you're talking about. The visual effects, the sound effects, the overall look of the thing is all bang-on. This is a polished production that shows off every cent of its feature film budget on every frame of its run time." Writing for The Ringer, Micah Peters said, "The Mandalorian may already be difficult to care about as something more than an installment that exists solely to set up the next installment. But there are still many enjoyable things about it, and also it's a Disney show with spaceships and giant sea slugs, so it doesn't need to be Citizen Kane. It might, however, be the next great TV Western."

Audience viewership

Within four days of its release, The Mandalorian had stronger U.S. demand compared to four of 2019's biggest streaming originals: Netflix's The Umbrella Academy, When They See Us, The Dark Crystal: Age of Resistance, and Amazon Prime Video's Good Omens. However, it registered less than 40% of the demand of Netflix's Stranger Things and was behind other established shows such as DC Universe's Titans, nor was it in the top 10 for the most in-demand shows across all TV networks and digital services for the week of November 10–16. TV Time, a popular app allowing users to track shows and movies they are watching (or want to watch), stated though that the number of people interested in The Mandalorian had doubled for the following week, and noted that it had the largest gain of any TV show.

Accolades

|-
! scope="row" rowspan="26" style="text-align:center;" | 2020
| rowspan="6" | Visual Effects Society Awards
| Outstanding Visual Effects in a Photoreal Episode
| Richard Bluff, Abbigail Keller, Jason Porter, Hayden Jones and Roy Cancinon (for "Chapter 2: The Child")
| 
| rowspan="6" |
|-
| Outstanding Virtual Cinematography in a CG Project
| Richard Bluff, Jason Porter, Landis Fields IV and Baz Idione (for "Chapter 6: The Prisoner"; The Roost)
| 
|-
| Outstanding Animated Character in an Episode or Real-Time Project
| Terry Bannon, Rudy Massar and Hugo Leygnac (for "Chapter 2: The Child"; Mudhorn)
| 
|-
| Outstanding Model in a Photoreal or Animated Project
| Doug Chiang, Jay Machado, John Goodson and Landis Fields IV (for "Chapter 3: The Sin"; The Razorcrest)
| 
|-
| Outstanding Created Environment in an Episode, Commercial, or Real-Time Project
| Alex Murtaza, Yanick Gaudreau, Marco Tremblay and Maryse Bouchard (for Nevarro Town)
| 
|-
| Outstanding Effects Simulations in an Episode, Commercial, or Real-Time Project
| Xavier Martin Ramirez, Ian Baxter, Fabio Slino and Andrea Rosa (for "Chapter 2: The Child"; Mudhorn)
| 
|-
| Art Directors Guild Awards
| One-Hour Period or Fantasy Single-Camera Series
| Andrew L. Jones (for "Chapter 1: The Mandalorian")
| 
|
|-
| ICG Publicists Awards
| Maxwell Weinberg Publicist Showmanship Television Award
| Disney+
| 
|
|-
| Nebula Awards
| Ray Bradbury Award for Outstanding Dramatic Presentation
| Jon Favreau (for "Chapter 2: The Child")
| 
|
|-
| Hugo Awards
| Best Dramatic Presentation - Short Form
| Jon Favreau and Taika Waititi (for "Chapter 8: Redemption")
| 
|
|-
| TCA Awards
| Outstanding New Program
| The Mandalorian
| 
|
|-
| Primetime Emmy Awards
| Outstanding Drama Series
| Jon Favreau, Dave Filoni, Kathleen Kennedy, Colin Wilson and Karen Gilchrist
| 
| 
|-
| rowspan="14"| Primetime Creative Arts Emmy Awards
| Outstanding Character Voice-Over Performance
| Taika Waititi as IG-11 (for "Chapter 8: Redemption")
| 
| rowspan="14"|
|-
| Outstanding Cinematography for a Single-Camera Series (Half-Hour)
| Greig Fraser and Baz Idoine (for "Chapter 7: The Reckoning")
| 
|-
| Outstanding Fantasy/Sci-Fi Costumes
| Joseph Porro, Julie Robar, Gigi Melton and Lauren Silvestri (for "Chapter 3: The Sin")
| 
|-
| Outstanding Guest Actor in a Drama Series
| Giancarlo Esposito as Moff Gideon (for "Chapter 8: Redemption")
| 
|-
| Outstanding Music Composition for a Series
| Ludwig Göransson (for "Chapter 8: Redemption")
| 
|-
| Outstanding Production Design for a Narrative Program (Half-Hour or Less)
| Andrew L. Jones, Jeff Wisniewski, Amanda Serino (for "Chapter 1: The Mandalorian")
| 
|-
| Outstanding Prosthetic Makeup for a Series, Limited Series, Movie or Special
| Brian Sipe, Alexei Dmitriew, Carlton Coleman, Samantha Ward, Scott Stoddard, Mike Ornelaz and Sabrina Castro (for "Chapter 6: The Prisoner")
| 
|-
| rowspan="3"| Outstanding Single-Camera Picture Editing for a Drama Series
| Andrew S. Eisen (for "Chapter 2: The Child")
| 
|-
| Dana E. Glauberman and Dylan Firshein (for "Chapter 4: Sanctuary")
| 
|-
| Jeff Seibenick (for "Chapter 8: Redemption")
| 
|-
| Outstanding Sound Editing for a Comedy or Drama Series (Half-Hour) and Animation
| David Acord, Matthew Wood, Bonnie Wild, James Spencer, Richard Quinn, Richard Gould, Stephanie McNally, Ryan Rubin, Ronni Brown and Jana Vance (for "Chapter 1: The Mandalorian")
| 
|-
| Outstanding Sound Mixing for a Comedy or Drama Series (Half-Hour) and Animation
| Shawn Holden, Bonnie Wild and Chris Fogel (for "Chapter 2: The Child")
| 
|-
| Outstanding Special Visual Effects
| Richard Bluff, Jason Porter, Abbigail Keller, Hayden Jones, Hal Hickel, Roy Cancino, John Rosengrant, Enrico Damm and Landis Fields (for "Chapter 2: The Child")
| 
|-
| Outstanding Stunt Coordination for a Drama Series, Limited Series or Movie
| Ryan Watson
| 
|-
! scope="row" rowspan="2" style="text-align:center;" | 2021
| rowspan="2"| Saturn Awards
| Best Television Presentation (under 10 Episode)
| The Mandalorian
| 
| rowspan="2"|
|-
| Best Guest Starring Role on Television
| Giancarlo Esposito
|  
|}

Documentary series 
In April 2020, Disney announced an eight-episode documentary series titled Disney Gallery: The Mandalorian (also known as Disney Gallery / Star Wars: The Mandalorian), which premiered on Disney+ on May 4, 2020, Star Wars Day. The series features interviews with the cast and crew of The Mandalorian, behind-the-scenes footage, and roundtable conversations hosted by Favreau that explore the production of The Mandalorian. Subsequent episodes of the series were released weekly on Disney+.

Notes

References

External links
 

2019 American television seasons
1